Muirchertach mac Maelruanaidh Mor was the second king of Moylurg, but is very obscure; not even the dates of his reign are known. He was succeeded by his son Tadhg.

References
 "Mac Dermot of Moylurg: The Story of a Connacht Family", Dermot Mac Dermot, 1996.
 http://www.macdermot.com/

Connachta
11th-century Irish monarchs
People from County Roscommon
MacDermot family